Zane Musa (January 1, 1979 – February 2, 2015) was an Alto/Soprano/Tenor saxophonist and vocalist, most widely known for his command of the saxophone. Zane Musa was raised in the San Fernando Valley, Los Angeles but his work is known worldwide. His works were showcased by the likes of Arturo Sandoval, Roy Hargrove, Macy Gray, John Mayer, Lupe Fiasco, and Christina Aguilera, as well as the Nikhil Korula Band and Karina Corradini. He also lent his sound to the house bands of several television shows including The Voice, Jimmy Kimmel Live, and The Carson Daly Show. He was a regular player in clubs in Hollywood and was invited to contribute to several bands, including Jeff Goldblum and the Mildred Snitzer Orchestra, fronted by Jeff Goldblum.

Some of his final work was touring and recording with Arturo Sandoval.  He was featured on the recording "Be Bop" alongside Arturo Sandoval. Zane was sought after by many fellow musicians/friends and had a long history of contributing his sound to a host of albums for various other artists.

Zane's solo jazz CD/LP was released under an independent label, Straight Ahead Records, founded by mastering engineer Bernie Grundman and Stewart Levine, producers for various artists including Dave Sandburn, Simply Red, Jamie Cullum, and the Crusaders.

As a soloist/bandleader/sideman Zane has performed in various venues, including the Playboy Jazz Festival, Lincoln Center, the IAJE conventions in Atlanta and New York, the Syracuse Jazz festival, the Blue Whale, Catalinas in Hollywood, and countless other venues.

Although Zane's roots were grounded in classic and improvisational jazz, Zane was working to bring forth an innovative blend of Jazz/Funk.  Melding styles together in a unique sax-intense sound distinctly his own.

Early years
Musa began his musical career early on, studying tap dancing with his brother Chance Taylor (an innovator in the world of tap dancing) By his junior high school years Zane began playing the saxophone and that became his main focus. He went to Van Nuys High School and studied at the Performing Arts Magnet Program.  He received his music degree from California Institute of the Arts, where he received a full scholarship.

Personal life
Zane Musa had four siblings, his brother/tap teacher and musical inspiration Chance Taylor, his brothers Omar Musa and Sam Musa, and his sister Yasmin Manley.  His mother Rebecca Musa and father Awad Musa encouraged his musical career from the very start.
Zane is remembered, not only as an incredible musical genius, but also as a kind, gentle, humorous spirit. Los Angeles Times, July 9, 2002 article featured a story capturing the giving spirit of Zane Musa, who performed saxophone in Skid Row, alongside bassist, Ravi Knypstra.  Both musicians gave of their time and talent to bring some joy to the streets.

Notability
Don Heckman saw Musa at the Catalina Jazz Club when he was 17 years old and commented that he was "...a name to remember". He has played for Arturo Sandoval, Roy Hargrove, Macy Gray, Christina Aguilera, and John Mayer. Planet Rhythm said he was one of the most talented saxophonists.

Death
Musa died on February 2, 2015, in Florida after playing at an annual jazz cruise.  He had apparently fallen from a Fort Lauderdale airport parking structure immediately following the jazz cruise on Sunday night.  He was transported to Broward Health Medical Center where he was declared dead the following day.

Discography
 (2005) Introducing Zane Musa, (Straight Ahead Recordings)

Credits
  (2014) Heaven, - Robert Francis & the Night Tide (Saxophone)
  (2014) Moving On, - Kan Wakan (Saxophone)
  (2013) The Best Man Holiday, (Saxophone)
  (2012) Dear Diz (Every Day I Think of You), - Arturo Sandoval (Featured Artist, Guest Artist, Sax (Alto))
  (2011) Endless Planets, - Austin Peralta (Sax (Alto))
  (2009) JLB Jazz Collective With Jason Gamer - JLB Jazz Collective (Sax (Alto))
  (2009) Reminiscence: Live!, - Phil Ranelin (Group Member, Sax (Alto))
  (2005) Gravity Always Wins, - Dave Tough (Saxophone)
  (2005) Static Trampoline, - Chris Pierce (Sax (Alto))
  (2004) Inspiration, - Phil Ranelin  (Main Personnel, Sax (Alto), Sax (Soprano))
  (2004) The Mother Funk Conspiracy, - Mother Funk Conspiracy (Main Personnel, Sax (Alto))
  (2003) The War of Women, - Joe Firstman  (Saxophone)
  (2001)  Orcastra, - Jon Bare (Group Member, Saxophone)
  (1999) Christmas Party Pack [Delta], (Saxophone)
  (1999) Holiday Moods, (Sax (Alto), Sax (Tenor))
  (1997) Holiday Sax Fantasy, (Primary Artist, Sax (Alto), Sax (Tenor))
  (1997) Ultimate Christmas Party Pack, (Primary Artist, Saxophone)

References

External links
 Official webpage

1979 births
2015 deaths
American jazz saxophonists
American male saxophonists
American male jazz musicians
20th-century American saxophonists